Salomon Sambia (born 7 September 1996), commonly known as Junior Sambia, is a French professional footballer who plays for  club Salernitana. He plays predominantly as a right back, but can also play as a defensive midfielder or winger.

Career

Chamois Niortais 
Born in Lyon, Sambia joined the youth set-up at Niort from Mâcon in 2013. In the summer of 2014, he was awarded a first-team contract alongside fellow youth midfielder Antoine Batisse. Sambia made his senior debut for Niort on 12 September 2014 in the 1–0 defeat to Dijon at the age of 18 years and 5 days, becoming the youngest player ever to start a professional match for the club. He went on to make five league appearances in total during the 2014–15 season.

Montpellier 
In August 2017, Sambia joined Montpellier on a one-year loan with an option to buy. The option would eventually be exercised at the end of the 2017–18 season. In May 2022, his exit from Montpellier at the end of the 2021–22 season was confirmed.

Salernitana
On 19 July 2022, Sambia signed a four-year contract with Salernitana in Italy.

Personal life
Sambia's parents are from the Central African Republic. In April 2020, Sambia was hospitalised after becoming ill and unconscious and was treated in intensive care. He tested positive for COVID-19 and was placed into an artificial coma. However, he eventually recovered.

Career statistics

References

External links
 

1996 births
Living people
Footballers from Lyon
French footballers
French sportspeople of Central African Republic descent
Association football midfielders
Association football wingers
Association football fullbacks
Association football utility players
Olympique Lyonnais players
UF Mâconnais players
Chamois Niortais F.C. players
Montpellier HSC players
U.S. Salernitana 1919 players
Ligue 1 players
Ligue 2 players
Championnat National 2 players
Championnat National 3 players
Serie A players
French expatriate footballers
Expatriate footballers in Italy
French expatriate sportspeople in Italy